The Women's 10 metre platform competition at the 2022 World Aquatics Championships was held on 26 and 27 June 2022.

Results
The preliminary round was started on 26 June at 12:00. The semifinal was held on 26 June at 19:00. The final was started on 27 June at 19:00.

Green denotes finalists

Blue denotes semifinalists

References

Women's 10 metre platform